Uchagaon  (उचगाव) is a village in the southern state of Karnataka, India. It is located in the Belgaum taluk of Belgaum district in Karnataka.
Last village on the way towards maharastra.

Malekrni devi Temple famous in uchagaon village

Demographics
 India census, Uchagaon had a population of 7716 with 3937 males and 3779 females.

See also
 Belgaum
 Districts of Karnataka

References

External links
 http://Belgaum.nic.in/

Villages in Belagavi district